Bayside High School is a public alternative secondary school in Clearwater, Florida, United States. The school is the first long-term alternative school in the Pinellas County School District and is a member of the Southern Association of Colleges and Schools.

History
In 1997, Pinellas County School Board members committed to building an alternative high school. Locating the campus on property already owned by the School Board near 58 St N and 150 Ave N, in Clearwater, was proposed, but residents complained about having the at-risk students in their neighborhood. The School Board purchased the current site for $2,400,000 after voters approved a referendum in November, 2002, and work began during Fall, 2003.

The school opened in the Fall semester of 2004.

Campus
Visual and performing arts studios are also located there. The school utilizes 65 surveillance cameras.
Dr. Konrad McCree, Jr became the principal in July 2021 replacing Dr. Dawn Coffin who retired.

Students
As of 2005–06, Bayside High School enrolled 376 students. The schools is a dropout prevention school, and student apply and are accepted most usually for credit recovery, or because they need to be in a smaller school. The graduation rate as of 2021 was nearly 80%. The school currently serves students in grades 9–12.

Curriculum
Bayside High School schedules four classes per day; many other high schools in Pinellas County have seven. The maximum class size is 22 students but has been known to exceed 30 students for certain classes needed for graduation, such as mathematics.

Bayside offers the a standard 18 credit diploma, which allows students to earn a state certified diploma and attend a college or trade school. Recently (2019), Bayside High School has begun adding a trades certification option for students to graduate with a diploma and a certification in a trade.

School accountability
The Florida Department of Education assigned the grade A to Bayside High School for the 2004–2005 school year, the grade A for the 2005–2006 school year, and the grade ''A' for the 2006–2007 school year.

References

External links

Pinellas County Schools Home Page
Bayside High School Home Page

Educational institutions established in 2004
High schools in Pinellas County, Florida
Schools accredited by the Southern Association of Colleges and Schools
Public high schools in Florida
Alternative schools in the United States
2004 establishments in Florida